The Lebanese Rocket Society is a 2012 Franco - Lebanese documentary film directed by Joana Hadjithomas and Khalil Joreige and released theatrically on 1 May 2013.

Synopsis
In the 1960s, Lebanon was the first Arab country to start sending rockets into the sky. Led by Manoug Manougian, their physics teacher, a small group of students from the Haigazian University (called Haigazian College at the time) began tests and launched their first rockets to conquer space under the name ″Lebanese Rocket Society″. Their work was briefly a source of national pride.

Cast and crew
 Director: Joana Hadjithomas and Khalil Joreige
 Production: Edouard Mauriat (Mille et une productions), and Georges Shoucair (Abbout Productions)
 France Distribution: Urban Distribution
 Photography: Jeanne Lapoirie and Khalil Joreige
 Animation: Ghassan Halawani
 Editing: Tina Baz
 Music: Scrambled Eggs
 Genre: Documentary
 Country of origin: France, Lebanon
 Format: DCP

Selections
 Official selection at the Doha Tribeca Film Festival 2012
 Official selection at the Toronto International Film Festival 2012
 Official selection at Cinéma du réel

See also
 Lebanese space program

References

2012 documentary films
2012 films
Documentary films about outer space
French documentary films
Lebanese documentary films
2010s French films